Olorunsogo is a Local Government Area in Oyo State, Nigeria. Its headquarters are in the town of Igbeti.

It has an area of 1,069 km and a population of 81,759 at the 2006 census.
  
The postal code of the area is 212.

References

Local Government Areas in Oyo State